Mötley Crüe are an American Music Award-winning Heavy Metal/Hard Rock band, and have been nominated for a MTV Video Music Award and three Grammy Award. They were inducted into the Hollywood Walk of Fame in 2006.

American Music Awards
The American Music Awards was created by Dick Clark in 1973 and is awarded annually. Mötley Crüe has received one awards out of four nominations

|-
| align="center" rowspan="2"|  ||Dr. Feelgood|| Favorite Heavy Metal/Hard Rock Album || 
|-
| Mötley Crüe || Favorite Heavy Metal/Hard Rock Artist || 
|-
| align="center" rowspan="2"|  ||Dr. Feelgood|| Favorite Heavy Metal/Hard Rock Album || 
|-
| Mötley Crüe || Favorite Heavy Metal/Hard Rock Artist || 
|-

Grammy Awards
The Grammy Awards are awarded annually by the National Academy of Recording Arts and Sciences.
Mötley Crüe has received three Grammy nominations,

|-
| align="center"|  || "Dr. Feelgood" || Best Hard Rock Performance || 
|-
| align="center"|  ||"Kickstart My Heart" || Best Hard Rock Performance || 
|-
| align="center"|  ||"Saints of Los Angeles" || Best Hard Rock Performance || 
|-

MTV Video Music Awards
The MTV Video Music Awards is an annual awards ceremony established in 1984 by MTV. Mötley Crüe has received one nominations.

|-
| align="center"|  ||"Kickstart My Heart" || Best Heavy Metal Video || 
|-

Hollywood Walk of Fame

Mötley Crüe was inducted into the Hollywood Walk of Fame in 2006.

|-
| align="center"| 2006 ||Mötley Crüe||Hollywood Walk of Fame||  Inducted
|-

References

Awards
Lists of awards received by American musician
Lists of awards received by musical group